Erymna or Orymna was a town in ancient Pamphylia or Lycia. The form "Orymna" is that given in the Synecdemus and the Notitiae Episcopatuum. and in the ecumenical councils, but inscriptions found on the site show that the inhabitants used the form with "E".  Stephanus of Byzantium stated that the form used in the Lyciaca of Alexander Polyhistor was Erymnae. The modern name of the site is Ormana, reflecting the ancient name.

Site 

Little remains of the town. Apart from the foundations of a colonnaded building and a single sarcophagus, only some architectural stones are to be found at Ormana.

History 

The town may have earlier been a member of the Kentenneis tribe, but it is known only as a normal independent Greek city. It never issued coinage.

Bishopric 

As a Christian bishopric, Orymna was a suffragan see of Side, the capital and metropolitan see of the Roman province of Pamphylia Prima. Its bishop Paulus took part in the Council of Ephesus in 431. Theodorus was at the Third Council of Constantinople in 480 and the Trullan Council of 692. Stephanus was one of the bishops at the Second Council of Nicaea in 787. And Methodius was at the Photian Council of Constantinople (879).

No longer a residential bishopric, Orymna is today listed by the Catholic Church as a titular see.

References

Populated places in ancient Pamphylia
Populated places in ancient Lycia
Catholic titular sees in Asia
Former populated places in Turkey
Ancient Greek archaeological sites in Turkey
Roman sites in Turkey
History of Antalya Province
İbradı District